Staffelegg Pass (el. 621 m.) is a mountain pass in the canton of Aargau in Switzerland.

It connects Küttigen and Asp. The postal bus route from Frick to Aarau goes over the pass, and there is a restaurant at the summit.

Mountain passes of Switzerland
Mountain passes of Aargau